The 1999 UEFA Regions' Cup was the first UEFA Regions' Cup. It was held in Italy and won by the Veneto team from the host nation, which beat Spain's Madrid 3–2, after extra time, in the final.

Preliminary round 
The 32 teams entered were drawn into eight groups of four, with the following countries hosting each group's matches:
Group 1 – 
Group 2 – 
Group 3 – 
Group 4 – 
Group 5 – 
Group 6 – 
Group 7 – 
Group 8 – 
The winners of each group qualified for the final tournament.

Group 1 

 (H) – Host

Notes:
All games played in Tbilisi, Georgia

Group 2 

 (H) – Host

Notes:
 All games played in Kraków, Poland

Group 3

Group 4

Group 5

Group 6

Group 7

Group 8

Final tournament 
Italy was chosen to host the final tournament, with matches being played from 31 October to 5 November 1999.

Group stage 
The eight preliminary group winners were drawn into two groups of four, with the two group winners advancing to the final.

Group A

Group B

Final

See also 
UEFA Regions' Cup

External links 
Official UEFA Regions' Cup site
RSSSF page for the 1999 UEFA Regions' Cup

1999
Regions' Cup
International association football competitions hosted by Italy
Regions' Cup